John Hailstone (13 December 1759 – 9 June 1847) was an English geologist.

Biography

Early life 
He was placed at an early age under the care of a maternal uncle at York, and was sent to Beverley school in the East Riding. Samuel Hailstone was a younger brother. John went to Cambridge, entering first at Catharine Hall, and afterwards at Trinity College, and was second wrangler and second in the Smith's Prize of his year (1782). He was second in both competitions to James Wood who became master of Saint John's, and Dean of Ely.

Career 
Hailstone was elected fellow of Trinity in 1784, and four years later became Woodwardian Professor of Geology, an office which he held for thirty years.

He went to Germany, and studied geology under Werner at Freiburg for about twelve months. On his return to Cambridge he devoted himself to the study and collection of geological specimens, but did not deliver any lectures. He published, however, in 1792, ‘A Plan of a course of lectures’. The museum was considerably enriched by him.

He was elected to the Linnean Society in 1800, and to the Royal Society in 1801, and was one of the original members of the Geological Society. Hailstone contributed papers to Transactions of the Geological Society (1816, iii. 243–50), Transactions of the Cambridge Philosophical Society (1822, i. 453–8), and the British Association (Report, 1834, p. 569).

Later life 
He married, and retired to the vicarage of Trumpington, near Cambridge, in 1818, and worked zealously for the education of the poor of his parish. He devoted much attention to chemistry and mineralogy, as well as to his favourite science, and kept for many years a meteorological diary. He made additions to the Woodwardian Museum, and left manuscript journals of his travels at home and abroad, and much correspondence on geological subjects.

He died at Trumpington on 9 June 1847, in his 88th year.

References

Attribution

External links
 

1759 births
1847 deaths
Alumni of Trinity College, Cambridge
Fellows of Trinity College, Cambridge
Woodwardian Professors of Geology
Fellows of the Royal Society
Fellows of the Geological Society of London
Fellows of the Linnean Society of London
Second Wranglers
English geologists
People from Trumpington